Pasquale "Wally" Buono  (born February 7, 1950) is the vice president of football operations, alternate governor and the former head coach of the BC Lions of the Canadian Football League (CFL), and one of the most successful head coaches in league history. He has spent 22 years as head coach of the Calgary Stampeders and the Lions, which is tied for the most seasons coached all-time. On September 19, 2009, Buono became the CFL's all-time winningest coach when his Lions beat the Toronto Argonauts 23–17, giving him 232 regular-season victories, passing Don Matthews. He retired in 2011 with a CFL record 254 regular-season wins as head coach, to focus on duties as general manager for the Lions. In 2016, Buono came out of retirement to coach the Lions again through the 2018 season. In the final home game of the 2018 season, Buono was honored with the Bob Ackles Award as he was retiring from football with the most wins as a coach.

Long before coaching Buono was a linebacker and punter for 10 seasons with the Montreal Alouettes, appearing in 152 consecutive games, not missing one, and in five Grey Cup games between 1972 and 1981, winning two in 1974 and 1977.

Buono's post-season coaching record is 23–17, with five Grey Cup victories in nine appearances. He won the Grey Cup championship in 1992, 1998 and 2001 as head coach of the Stampeders and in 2006 and 2011 as head coach of the Lions. He won the Annis Stukus Trophy as the CFL's Coach of the Year four times, in 1992, 1993, 2006, and 2011, second only to Don Matthews, who had five.

Early years and playing career
Born in Potenza, Italy in 1950, Buono moved to Canada in 1953 with his family. He became interested in football after playing pick up games as a youth in Montréal-Nord, Quebec and being encouraged by CFL all-star Al Phaneuf, a Christian who was coaching a youth football team at one of Montreal’s parks (who invited Buono to join the team.) Soon after, he began playing minor football in Montreal, Quebec.

Buono attended Idaho State University and was a linebacker for the ISU Bengals. He returned to Canada and played 10 seasons with the Montreal Alouettes as a linebacker and punter, appearing in 152 consecutive games, not missing one in his career. He appeared in five Grey Cups between 1974 and 1979, winning two in 1974 and 1977.

Career regular season statistics

Coaching career

Calgary Stampeders
Shortly after his retirement, Buono landed an assistant coaching position with the Montreal Concordes in 1983. In 1987, he moved to Calgary and worked with the Calgary Stampeders under Lary Kuharich until 1990, when he was hired as head coach by Stampeders president Norman Kwong.

Buono served as head coach of the Stampeders for thirteen years (1990–2002), amassing a regular season record of 153–79–2, far and away the most wins in Stampeders history. He led the Stampeders to eight first-place finishes, including five straight from 1992 to 1996, and missing the playoffs only once, in 2002. The Stampeders went to six Grey Cup games under Buono, winning three in 1992, 1998, and 2001, and losing three in 1991, 1995, 1999. He left the franchise as its winningest coach in terms of victories and championships, allegedly only leaving because the Stampeders attempted to force him to play Kevin Feterik, the owner's son, as the starting quarterback, a charge both the Feteriks denied.

BC Lions
Buono left the Stampeders in 2003 and was hired as head coach and general manager of the BC Lions prior to the 2003 season. In the first five seasons under Buono (2003–2007), the Lions went 62–27–1 in regular-season play, with five straight playoff appearances, four straight first-place finishes (2004–2007), and two Grey Cup appearances: a 27-19 loss to the Toronto Argonauts in 2004 and a 25-14 victory over the Montreal Alouettes in 2006. His teams went through a slight downturn for the following three seasons, including two that were under .500. His team returned to prominence in 2011 after they once again finished first in the west division and followed it with a 34-23 victory over the Winnipeg Blue Bombers in the 99th Grey Cup at home.

He announced his resignation as head coach of the Lions on December 5, 2011 to focus on his duties as general manager.

In 2014, he was inducted into the Canadian Football Hall of Fame.

From 2012 through the 2015 CFL season the Lions failed to win any playoff games, despite making the playoffs all four seasons. On December 2, 2015, the Lions announced that Buono would resume his position as head coach for the 2016 CFL season after head coach Jeff Tedford announced his resignation following a disappointing 7-11 season. On March 2, 2016, the  Lions announced that they had extended Wally Buono's contract (as a head-coach/GM) through the 2017 CFL season.

Following the 2017 season, Buono announced he was relinquishing the General Manager position in order to focus on his head coaching duties.  Ed Hervey was hired as the new GM of the Lions.  Buono retains his position as the Vice President of Football Operations.  Buono also stated that 2018 will be his final year as head coach. With 129 wins over two stints, he is the winningest coach in Lions history, and one of the few coaches to top the all-time wins list with two CFL teams.

Style
Buono is often credited with developing some of the best CFL quarterbacks of his era, such as Doug Flutie, Jeff Garcia, Dave Dickenson, Travis Lulay and Jonathon Jennings. He is considered one of the best offensive minds in league history.

CFL coaching record

Wally Buono Award
The Wally Buono Award was established in 2003 by The Saint Bernard Pass Charitable Foundation for the purpose of recognizing Canada's top junior football player. The award is a national award. Recipients must prove their athletic and leadership ability on the field as well as a high level of leadership within their community. The Saint Bernard Pass Charitable Foundation is the Swiss-based foundation of Christina Saint Marche. The winners of the award are as follows:

 2014 – LB Dylan Chapdelaine, Vancouver Island Raiders (BCFC/CJFL)
 2013 – QB Asher Hastings, Regina Thunder (PCF/CJFL)
 2012 – QB Jordan Yantz, Vancouver Island Raiders (BCFC/CJFL)
 2011 – SB Michael Schaper, Vancouver Island Raiders (BCFC/CJFL)
 2010 – DL Kleevens Jean-Louis, Châteauguay Raiders (QJFL)
 2009 – RB Andrew Harris, Vancouver Island Raiders (BCFC/CJFL)
 2008 – WR Cassidy Doneff, Calgary Colts (PFC/CJFL)
 2007 – RB Tristan Jones, Edmonton Wildcats (PFC/CJFL)
 2006 – QB Nate Friesen, Winnipeg Rifles (PFC/CJFL)
 2005 – RB Jeff Halvorson, Posthumous, Okanagan Sun (BCFC/CJFL)
 2004 – RB Chris Ciezki, Edmonton Huskies (PFC/CJFL)
 2003 – RB Alan Giacalone, Calgary Colts (PFC/CJFL)

See also
 List of Canadian Football League head coaches by wins
 List of professional gridiron football coaches with 200 wins

References

External links
 

1950 births
Living people
American football linebackers
Canadian football linebackers
Canadian football punters
BC Lions coaches
BC Lions general managers
Calgary Stampeders coaches
Calgary Stampeders general managers
Idaho State Bengals football players
Montreal Alouettes players
Canadian Football Hall of Fame inductees
People from Potenza
Players of Canadian football from Quebec
Members of the Order of Canada
Anglophone Quebec people
Italian emigrants to Canada
Canadian football people from Montreal
People from Montréal-Nord
Montreal Alouettes coaches